Brian Joseph Meehan (born 16 July 1967 in Limerick, Ireland) is a trainer of Thoroughbred racehorses who began his career as a licensed trainer in 1992. Since 2006 he has been based on the Marlborough Downs at the historic Manton Estate near Manton, Wiltshire, which he purchased in October 2017.

Major wins 

 Cheveley Park Stakes - (2) Magical Romance (2004), Donna Blini (2005)
 Champion Stakes - (1) David Junior (2005)
 Eclipse Stakes  - (1) David Junior(2006)
 Racing Post Trophy - (1) Crowded House (2008) 
 St. James's Palace Stakes - (1) Most Improved (2012)

 Dubai Duty Free Stakes - (1) David Junior(2006)

 Prix de la Forêt - (1) Tomba (1998)
 Prix Morny - (2) Bad As I Wanna Be (2000), Arcano (2009)

 Bayerisches Zuchtrennen - (1) Kaieteur (2002)

 Breeders' Cup Turf - (2) Red Rocks (2006), Dangerous Midge (2010)

References

1967 births
Living people
Irish racehorse trainers
People from Limerick (city)